George Walter Foster (born 26 September 1956) is an English former footballer and manager, who now works as assistant manager to James Rowe at National League club Chesterfield.

He began his career as a full-back, but was later moved into central defence. He began his career at Plymouth Argyle in 1974, and went on to spend eight years with the "Pilgrims", winning promotion out of the Third Division in 1974–75, as well as the club's Player of the Year award in 1978 and 1980. He also played on loan at Torquay United and Exeter City. He was sold on to Derby County for a £40,000 fee in June 1982, before moving on to Mansfield Town the following year. He spent the next decade with the "Stags", and after being named as the club's Player of the Year, was then named on the PFA Team of the Year as he helped Mansfield to win promotion out of the Fourth Division in 1985–86. He also won the Football League Trophy with the club in 1987. He was appointed player-manager in February 1989, and led the club to promotion out of the Fourth Division in 1991–92, but was sacked after failing to keep Mansfield in the Third Division. He ended his playing career with 649 league appearances in a 20-year career in the Football League. He later managed Conference club Telford United from 1993 to 1995, before becoming a professional scout.

Playing career

Plymouth Argyle
Foster began his career at his hometown club Plymouth Argyle, moving from the youth-team through the reserve team and into the first-team. He made his debut in a Third Division match against Hereford United on 20 February 1974. The club finished in 17th place in 1973–74, before winning promotion as the division's runners-up in 1974–75 – they finished just one point behind champions Blackburn Rovers. Argyle went on to finish 16th in the Second Division in 1975–76, before slipping back into the third tier after finishing two points short of safety in 1976–77. Foster also spent a brief time on loan at Devon rivals Torquay United in October 1976, scoring three goals in six league games. The "Pilgrims" replaced manager Tony Waiters with Mike Kelly, and only avoided a second successive relegation by just two places and three points in 1977–78 after Malcolm Allison replaced Kelly as manager in March. Foster was changed to the centre-back position during the campaign and it was there that he established himself as a mainstay in the starting eleven.

Under the stewardship of new boss Bobby Saxton, Plymouth moved up to a more secure 15th-place finish in 1978–79, and Foster recovered from a broken leg to regain his first-team spot for the 1979–80 campaign. Plymouth rose to seventh place in 1980–81, before new manager Bobby Moncur led the club to a tenth-place finish in 1981–82. Foster spent part of the season on loan at Brian Godfrey's Exeter City, playing 28 Third Division games at St James Park after making his debut against Plymouth on 28 December. He was an ever-present at Exeter for the remainder of the campaign and became the first player to win the club's Player of the Year award whilst on loan from another club. He turned down a transfer to Sheffield United as he did not want to drop down to the Fourth Division. During an eight-year spell at Home Park, Foster scored six goals in 248 league and cup appearances and was named as the club's Player of the Year in 1978 and 1980.

Derby County
In June 1982, Derby County manager Peter Taylor paid £40,000 for his services. Foster would only spend one season at the Baseball Ground, playing 30 Second Division games for the "Rams".

Mansfield Town
Foster joined Mansfield Town on a free transfer in summer 1983. He made his Mansfield debut on 27 August 1983 in a 4–0 defeat against Bristol City. However, things would soon take a turn for the better, and Foster was named the club's Player of the Year as Ian Greaves's "Stags" finished 19th in the Fourth Division in 1983–84. He was then named team captain, and marshalled a defence that only conceded 38 goals in the league in 1984–85. In 1985–86, Foster helped the Field Mill outfit gain promotion in third place, and was recognised by his peers with a place on the PFA Team of the Year. Mansfield then finished tenth in the Third Division in 1986–87, and Foster captained the side in their triumph at Wembley as Mansfield won the Football League Trophy after a penalty shoot-out victory over Bristol City. Town then finished just two places and two points above the relegation zone in 1987–88.

Managerial career

Mansfield Town
When Ian Greaves stepped down as Mansfield manager in February 1989, Foster was named player-manager. The "Stags" ended the 1988–89 season in 15th place in the Third Division. In his first full season in charge, 1989–90, Mansfield again posted a 15th-place finish. They suffered relegation after finishing bottom of the division in the 1990–91 campaign. Foster then took the Field Mill outfit straight back up after leading the club to the third and final automatic Fourth Division promotion place in 1991–92. However, he could not keep the club in the Third Division, as they went straight back down in 1992–93. In September 1993, following a poor start to the 1993–94 season, Foster was sacked as manager. Mansfield went on to finish in 12th place under new manager Andy King.

Telford United
In October 1993, Foster was named player-manager at Telford United, where he stayed until June 1995. He led the "Bucks" to 17th and 19th-place finishes in the Conference in 1993–94 and 1994–95, as Telford finished just above the relegation zone.

Scouting career
After a spell as assistant manager at Lincoln City, Foster was appointed chief scout at Wolverhampton Wanderers by manager Dave Jones in April 2001. He worked as chief scout at Coventry City until he was sacked after manager Micky Adams was replaced by Iain Dowie in February 2008. He was appointed as Academy director by Stoke City boss Tony Pulis in April 2007. He later scouted for the Glenn Hoddle Academy, before being appointed chief scout at Hull City by manager Nick Barmby in December 2011. He was appointed chief scout at Port Vale by Micky Adams in November 2012. His greatest success was to spot Jordan Hugill playing in non-league football; he left the position in June 2014 to take up a new role as Swansea City's European scout. He was appointed as assistant manager to James Rowe at National League North club Gloucester City at December 2019. He followed Rowe to Chesterfield in November 2020.

Career statistics
Source:

A.  The "Other" column constitutes appearances and goals in the League Cup, Football League Trophy, Football League play-offs and Full Members Cup.

Honours
Individual
Plymouth Argyle F.C. Player of the Year: 1978 & 1979–80
Exeter City F.C. Player of the Year: 1981–82
Mansfield Town F.C. Player of the Year: 1984
PFA Team of the Year (Fourth Division): 1985–86

Mansfield Town
Football League Fourth Division third-place promotion: 1985–86
Football League Trophy: 1987
Football League Fourth Division third-place promotion: 1991–92

References

1956 births
Living people
Footballers from Plymouth, Devon
English footballers
Association football central defenders
Plymouth Argyle F.C. players
Torquay United F.C. players
Exeter City F.C. players
Derby County F.C. players
Mansfield Town F.C. players
Telford United F.C. players
English Football League players
National League (English football) players
Association football player-managers
English football managers
Mansfield Town F.C. managers
Telford United F.C. managers
English Football League managers
National League (English football) managers
Association football coaches
Association football scouts
Lincoln City F.C. non-playing staff
Wolverhampton Wanderers F.C. non-playing staff
Coventry City F.C. non-playing staff
Stoke City F.C. non-playing staff
Hull City A.F.C. non-playing staff
Port Vale F.C. non-playing staff
Swansea City A.F.C. non-playing staff
Chesterfield F.C. non-playing staff